John Alonzo Barney (June 14, 1840May 19, 1911) was an American educator, politician, and judge.  He served in the Wisconsin State Senate and Assembly, representing Dodge County, and was county judge for twelve years.  He also served in the Union Army during the American Civil War.

Early life
John A. Barney was born in Lenox, New York, in June 1840.  He moved west with his parents in 1847, settling at Mayville, Wisconsin, and was educated there.  After completing his primary school education, he studied law for two years, but interrupted his studies to volunteer for service in the American Civil War.

Civil War service
Barney enlisted at the call for three-year volunteers near the start of the Civil War and was enrolled in Company B of the 10th Wisconsin Infantry Regiment.  The regiment mustered into federal service in October 1861 and served in the western theater of the war.  Barney was promoted to corporal, sergeant, and ultimately first sergeant.  He was badly wounded at the Battle of Chickamauga, he was taken prisoner and his arm was amputated.  He was quickly paroled and was discharged due to disability in November 1863.  After the war, he received an honorary Brevet from Governor Lucius Fairchild to the rank of captain in recognition for his performance at the battles of Perryville and Chickamauga.

Political and judicial career
Back in Mayville, he was appointed postmaster by President Andrew Johnson, but resigned after Grant's election.  He went on to work as school superintendent for the eastern district of Dodge County from 1870 through 1874.  In the Fall of 1874, he was elected on the Democratic Party ticket to the Wisconsin State Senate for Wisconsin's 13th State Senate district—then-comprising all of Dodge County.  He served in the 1875 and 1876 legislative sessions and was not a candidate for re-election in 1876.

During the 46th United States Congress, Barney was hired as clerk of the U.S. House Committee on War Claims.  The chairman of the committee was Wisconsin's Edward S. Bragg.

Back in Wisconsin, he worked as principal of the Mayville schools for 15 years and served in several local offices. He served as a justice of the peace and was a member and president of the Mayville village board.  He was elected to the Wisconsin State Assembly in 1888, representing eastern Dodge County.  He was elected county judge of Dodge County in the 1897 spring election, defeating incumbent judge C. A. Christiansen.  He was re-elected in 1901 and 1905 but did not run for a fourth term in 1909.

He died at his home in Mayville a year after leaving office, on May 19, 1911.

Personal life
Barney was active in the Independent Order of Odd Fellows and the Soldiers' Relief Association.  John Barney married Henrietta Beeson in 1866.  They had at least five children, but two died in infancy.  Barney was survived by his wife and three daughters.

Electoral history

Wisconsin Senate (1874)

| colspan="6" style="text-align:center;background-color: #e9e9e9;"| General Election, November 3, 1874

Wisconsin Assembly (1888)

| colspan="6" style="text-align:center;background-color: #e9e9e9;"| General Election, November 6, 1888

References

External links
 

1840 births
1911 deaths
People from Mayville, Wisconsin
People from Lenox, New York
People of Wisconsin in the American Civil War
Union Army officers
Union Army soldiers
Mayors of places in Wisconsin
Wisconsin city council members
Democratic Party Wisconsin state senators
Democratic Party members of the Wisconsin State Assembly
Wisconsin postmasters
Wisconsin state court judges